Topics related to Nauru (arranged alphabetically) include:

A
Acrocephalus rehsei
Aiwo Constituency
Aiwo District
Aloysius Amwano
Anabar District
Anetan District
Angam Day
Angelita Detudamo
Anibare District
Areop-Enap
Audi Dabwido
Australian rules football in Nauru
Aweida

B
Baiti District
Baron Waqa
Bernard Dowiyogo

Boe Constituency

C
Canals in Nauru
Centre Party (Nauru)
Constitution of Nauru
COVID-19 pandemic in Nauru
Crime in Nauru
Culture of Nauru

D
David Adeang
Democratic Party of Nauru
Demographics of Nauru
Denigomodu District
Derog Gioura
Districts of Nauru

E
Economy of Nauru
Education in Nauru

F
Fabian Ribauw
Flag of Nauru
Foreign relations of Nauru
Freddie Pitcher

G
Geology of Nauru
Geography of Nauru
Godfrey Thoma
Greta Harris

H
Hammer DeRoburt
History of Nauru
History of wireless telegraphy and broadcasting in Nauru (summary of History of wireless telegraphy and broadcasting in Australia#Nauru
History of wireless telegraphy and broadcasting in Australia#Nauru (includes full transcripts of many Trove articles)
Human rights in Nauru

I
Ijuh
Ijuw District
India-Nauru relations

J
Japanese occupation of Nauru
Joanne Gobure
John Fearn (whaler)

K
Kenas Aroi
Kennan Adeang
Kieren Keke
Kinza Clodumar

L
Lagumot Harris
LGBT rights in Nauru
Linkbelt Oval
List of birds of Nauru
Ludwig Scotty

M
Marcus Stephen
Margaret Hendrie
Marlene Moses
Mathew Batsiua
Meneng Constituency
Meneng District
Millicent Aroi
Moqua Caves
Moqua Well
Music of Nauru

N
National Stadium (Nauru)
Nauru at the 1996 Summer Olympics
Nauru at the 2000 Summer Olympics
Nauru at the 2002 Commonwealth Games
Nauru at the 2004 Summer Olympics
Nauru at the 2006 Commonwealth Games
Nauru at the 2008 Summer Olympics
Nauru at the 2010 Commonwealth Games
Nauru at the 2010 Summer Youth Olympics
Nauru at the Commonwealth Games
Nauru at the Olympics
Nauru Broadcasting Service
Nauru Bwiema
Nauru Congregational Church
Nauru First
Nauru House
Nauru International Airport
Nauru Island Agreement
Nauru Olympic Committee
Nauru Pacific Line
Nauru Phosphate Corporation
Nauru Phosphate Royalties Trust
Nauru reed warbler
Nauru Regional Processing Centre
Nauru–Russia relations
Nauru Television
Nauru
Nauruan Civil War
2010 Nauruan constitutional referendum
Nauruan indigenous religion
Nauruan language
Nauruan nationality law
2007 Nauruan parliamentary election
2008 Nauruan parliamentary election
Nauruan Pidgin English
2007 Nauruan presidential election
2010 Nauruan presidential election
2011 Nauruan presidential election
2013 Nauruan presidential election
2016 Nauruan presidential election
Nauruan Tribal War
Nauruans
Nibok District

O
Obesity in Nauru
Operation Weasel
Our Airline
Outline of Nauru

P
Parliament of Nauru
Philip Delaporte
Phosphate mining in Nauru
Political families of Nauru
Politics of Nauru
President of Nauru

R
Radio Nauru
Rail transport in Nauru
Reanna Solomon
Religion in Nauru
René Harris
Republic of Nauru Hospital
Riddell Akua
Roland Kun
Ruben Kun
Russell Kun
Rykers Solomon

S
Scouting and Guiding in Nauru
Sprent Dabwido
State House (Nauru)
Supreme Court of Nauru

T
Transport in Nauru

U
Uaboe District
Ubenide Constituency

V
Visa policy of Nauru

Y
Yaren District
Yukio Peter

See also

Lists of country-related topics – similar lists for other countries

 
Nauru